The Telephone Transfer Act 1911 was a United Kingdom statute, which nationalised the telephone companies. The National Telephone Company had become a monopoly and so the Liberal government decided to take it into public hands.

See also
UK enterprise law
Telegraph Act 1868

United Kingdom Acts of Parliament 1911
History of telecommunications in the United Kingdom